The This is the Place Monument is a historical monument at the This is the Place Heritage Park, located on the east side of Salt Lake City, Utah, at the mouth of Emigration Canyon.  It is named in honor of Brigham Young's famous statement in 1847 that the Latter-day Saint pioneers should settle in the Salt Lake Valley. Mahonri M. Young, a grandson of Brigham Young, sculpted the monument between 1939 and 1947 at Weir Farm in Connecticut. Young was awarded $50,000 to build the monument in 1939 and he was assisted by Spero Anargyros. It stands as a monument to the Mormon pioneers as well as the explorers and settlers of the American West. It was dedicated by LDS Church President George Albert Smith on 24 July 1947, the hundredth anniversary of the pioneers entering the Salt Lake Valley. It replaced a much smaller monument located nearby.

Groups on the monument
Brigham Young, Heber C. Kimball and Wilford Woodruff on the top of the monument
Mormon pioneers from the vanguard expedition of 1847 including the nine preliminary explorers, the main company and the rear group.
Donner Party
Spanish explorers from the Domínguez–Escalante expedition in 1776
William H. Ashley and American Fur Company Trappers

Individuals on the monument

Benjamin Bonneville
John Brown
Isaac Perry Decker
John C. Fremont
Hugh Glass
Heber C. Kimball
Ellen Sanders Kimball
Jesse C. Little
Joseph Matthews
Peter Skene Ogden
John Pack
Orson Pratt
Etienne Provost
Willard Richards
Orrin Porter Rockwell
Father de Smet
George A. Smith
Erastus Snow
Chief Washakie
Wilford Woodruff
Brigham Young
Clarissa Decker Young
Harriet Page Wheeler Decker Young
Lorenzo Dow Young
Lorenzo Sobieski Young

See also

 Mormon handcart pioneers
 Mormon Trail
 Pioneer Day (Utah)
 Utah…This Is The Place

References

External links

 This is the Place Monument Official website
 Science Views This is the Place Monument website

1947 sculptures
Buildings and structures in Salt Lake City
Monuments and memorials in Utah
Mormon migration to Utah
Outdoor sculptures in Salt Lake City
Tourist attractions in Salt Lake City